Peetri River is a river in Võru County, Estonia. The river is 26.7 km long and basin size is 43 km2. It runs into Mustjõgi.

Trouts and Thymallus thymallus live also in the river.

References

Rivers of Estonia
Võru County